Beta-arrestin-2, also known as arrestin beta-2, is an intracellular protein that in humans is encoded by the ARRB2 gene.

Members of arrestin/beta-arrestin protein family are thought to participate in agonist-mediated desensitization of G protein-coupled receptors and cause specific dampening of cellular responses to stimuli such as hormones, neurotransmitters, or sensory signals, as well as having signalling roles in their own right. Arrestin beta 2, like arrestin beta 1, was shown to inhibit beta-adrenergic receptor function in vitro. It is expressed at high levels in the central nervous system and may play a role in the regulation of synaptic receptors. Besides the brain, a cDNA for arrestin beta 2 was isolated from thyroid gland, and thus it may also be involved in hormone-specific desensitization of TSH receptors. Multiple alternatively spliced transcript variants have been found for this gene, but the full-length nature of some variants has not been defined.

The protein may interact with the agonist DOI in 5-HT2A receptor signaling.

Arrestin beta 2 is crucial for the development of tolerance to morphine and other opioids.

Interactions 

Arrestin beta 2 has been shown to interact with
  AP2B1,
 PSCD2,
 Mdm2, and
 RALGDS.

References

Further reading

External links
 

Genes
Human proteins